Cherae Clark, also known under the pen name C. L. Clark, is an American author and editor of speculative fiction, a personal trainer, and an English teacher. She graduated from Indiana University's creative writing MFA and was a 2012 Lambda Literary Fellow. Their debut novel, The Unbroken, first book of the Magic of the Lost trilogy, was published by Orbit Books in 2021 and received critical acclaim, including starred reviews at Publishers Weekly and Library Journal. Her work has appeared in Beneath Ceaseless Skies, FIYAH Literary Magazine of Black Speculative Fiction, Glitter + Ashes: Queer Tales of a World That Wouldn't Die, PodCastle, Tor.com, Uncanny, and The Year's Best African Speculative Fiction (2021). Clark edited, with series editor Charles Payseur,  We're Here: The Best Queer Speculative Fiction of 2020, which was a finalist for the 2022 Ignyte Award for Best Anthology/Collected Work.

Biography 
C. L. Clark earned an MFA in creative writing from Indiana University, was a 2012 Lambda Literary Fellow, and has studied post-colonial literary theory.

Career 
Clark's short fiction has appeared in numerous publications, including Beneath Ceaseless Skies, FIYAH Literary Magazine of Black Speculative Fiction, Glitter + Ashes: Queer Tales of a World That Wouldn't Die, PodCastle, Tor.com, Uncanny, The Year's Best African Speculative Fiction (2021), and The Best American Science Fiction and Fantasy (2022). Her short story "You Perfect, Broken Thing", published in Uncanny Magazine, won the 2021 Ignyte Award for Best Short Story.

Clark served as a co-editor of PodCastle from 2019 to 2021. With series editor Charles Payseur, Clark edited We're Here: The Best Queer Speculative Fiction 2020, an anthology of queer speculative fiction published by Neon Hemlock. We're Here: The Best Queer Speculative Fiction 2020 was nominated for the 2022 Ignyte Award for Best Anthology/Collected Work, and winner of the 2022 Locus Award for Best Anthology.

Clark's debut novel, The Unbroken, was published in 2021 and met with praise from critics, earning a starred review from both Library Journal and Publishers Weekly. The Unbroken was nominated for the Ignyte Award for Best Novel: Adult, the Nebula Award for Best Novel, the Locus Award for Best First Novel, and the British Fantasy Society's Robert Holdstock Award for Best Fantasy Novel.

Awards and nominations

Bibliography

Magic of the Lost trilogy 

 The Unbroken, Orbit Books, 2021
 The Faithless, Orbit Books, expected 2023

Short fiction 
 "Your Eyes, My Beacon: Being an Account of Several Misadventures and How I Found My Way Home", first published in Uncanny Magazine, issue #46, 2022
 "The Captain and the Quartermaster", first published in Beneath Ceaseless Skies, issue #326, 2021
 "When the Last of the Birds and Bees Have Gone On", first published in Glitter + Ashes: Queer Tales of a World That Wouldn't Die, Neon Hemlock Press, 2020
 "Forgive Me, My Love, for the Ice and the Sea", first published in Beneath Ceaseless Skies, issue #296, 2020
 "You Perfect, Broken Thing", first published in Uncanny Magazine, issue #32, 2020
 "The Cook", first published in Uncanny Magazine, issue #22, 2018
 "Burning Season", first published in PodCastle, #519, 2018
 "Sisyphus", first published in FIYAH Literary Magazine of Black Speculative Fiction, issue #4, 2017

Essays 
 "The Crosses We Bear: The Butch Martyr in SFF", published on Tor.com, 2022
 "WWXD: A Warrior's Path of Reflection and Redemption", published in Uncanny Magazine, issue #41
 "The Fiction of Peace, the Fantasy of War", published in Fantasy Magazine, issue #66, 2021

Editor 
 We're Here: The Best Queer Speculative Fiction of 2020, Neon Hemlock Press, 2021
 PodCastle, co-editor 2019-2021

Notes

See also 
 List of fantasy authors
 List of LGBT writers

References

External links 
 Official website
 C. L. Clark at the Internet Speculative Fiction Database

Interviews 
 Interview with Author C. L. Clark Michele Kirichanskaya, Geeks Out, 2021
 C. L. Clark Tells Us About Her New Fantasy Book, The Unbroken Daniel Roman, winteriscoming.net, 2021
 Episode 144 - Interview with CL Clark, Author of The Unbroken Gin Jenny, Reading the End, 2021
 Color the Shelves - Interview with C. L. Clark, author of The Unbroken Fadwa, Word Wonders, 2021
 Episode 354: Character, Conflict, and World Building in Fantasy - Interview with C. L. Clark Gabriela Pereira, diyMFA, 2021

21st-century LGBT people
Queer writers
Black speculative fiction authors
American fantasy writers
21st-century American novelists
21st-century American short story writers
Living people
Year of birth missing (living people)